The Wales Act 2014 is an Act of the Parliament of the United Kingdom.

The bill was introduced to the House of Commons on 20 March 2014 by Chief Secretary to the Treasury, Danny Alexander and Secretary of State for Wales, David Jones. The purpose of the bill was to implement some of the recommendations of the Silk Commission aimed at devolving further powers from the United Kingdom to Wales.

It passed the final hurdles in Parliament and received Royal assent on 17 December 2014, becoming law.

Provisions
The Act's provisions include the following:
 Devolving stamp duty, business rates and landfill tax to Wales and enabling the Welsh Assembly to replace them with new taxes specific to Wales. Further taxes can also be devolved, with the agreement of the UK Parliament and the Welsh Assembly.
 Providing for a referendum in Wales on whether an element of income tax should be devolved.  If there is a vote in favour then the Welsh Assembly will be able to set a Welsh income tax rate. Fluctuations in revenues will be managed by new borrowing powers for Welsh Ministers.
 Extending Welsh Assembly terms permanently from four to five years in order to reduce the chance of Assembly elections clashing with general elections to the Westminster Parliament as a result of the Fixed-term Parliaments Act 2011.
 Removing the prohibition on candidates in Welsh Assembly elections from standing in a constituency and also being on the regional list.
 Prohibiting Welsh Assembly Members from also being MPs (see dual mandate).
 Formally changing the Welsh Assembly Government’s name to the Welsh Government.
 Clarifying the position of the First Minister between dissolution of the Assembly and an Assembly election.
 Allowing Welsh Ministers to set a limit for the amount of housing debt that individual local housing authorities in Wales may hold. The UK Treasury will limit the total Welsh housing debt.
 Requiring the Law Commission to provide advice and information to Welsh Ministers on the law reform matters that they referred to the Commission.

See also
Welsh devolution
Commission on Devolution in Wales
St David's Day Agreement
Wales Act 2017
Government of Wales Act 2006

References

External links
legislation.gov.uk Wales Act 2014

United Kingdom Acts of Parliament 2014
Government of Wales
Senedd
Constitutional laws of Wales
Acts of the Parliament of the United Kingdom concerning Wales
Welsh devolution
2014 in British law
2014 in British politics
2014 in Wales
December 2014 events in the United Kingdom